Omidiyeh County is in Khuzestan province, Iran. The capital of the county is the city of Omidiyeh. At the 2006 census, the county's population was 85,195 in 17,557 households. The following census in 2011 counted 90,420 people in 22,723 households. At the 2016 census, the county's population was 92,335 in 25,123 households, by which time Julaki Rural District had been separated from the county to join Aghajari County.

Administrative divisions

The population history and structural changes of Omidiyeh County's administrative divisions over three consecutive censuses are shown in the following table. The latest census shows two districts, three rural districts, and two cities.

References

 

Counties of Khuzestan Province